The 1952 New Mexico gubernatorial election took place on November 4, 1952, in order to elect the Governor of New Mexico. Incumbent Republican Edwin L. Mechem ran for reelection to a second term.

General election

Results

References

1952
gubernatorial
New Mexico
November 1952 events in the United States